Euphaedra hybrida is a butterfly in the family Nymphalidae. It is found in Central Africa.

Similar species
Other members of the Euphaedra eleus species group q.v.

References

Butterflies described in 1978
hybrida